Spittle is an English surname, referring to someone who worked in a .  Notable persons with the surname include:

 Alison Spittle,  Irish comedian and writer
 Billy Spittle (born 1894), English professional footballer
 Denys Spittle (1920–2003), English archaeologist
 Margaret Spittle (born 1939), British oncologist
 Max Spittle (1920–2015), Australian rules footballer
 Rod Spittle, Canadian golfer

English-language surnames